Lyle Petersen (born 15 August 1995) is a South African cricketer. He made his first-class debut on 19 December 2019, for Eastern Province in the 2019–20 CSA 3-Day Provincial Cup. He made his List A debut on 27 October 2019, for Eastern Province in the 2019–20 CSA Provincial One-Day Challenge.

References

External links
 

1995 births
Living people
South African cricketers
Eastern Province cricketers
Place of birth missing (living people)